Cate is a feminine given name. It is a variant of Kate. The name comes from Latin, French, English, and Welsh origins. The name literally means either 'pure' or 'blessed', used in different context.  The name Catherine is popular in Christian countries, as it was the name of one of the first Christian saints, Catherine of Alexandria. Its variants are also widely used around the world.

In addition, Cate is also a surname. Notable people with the name include:

In film and television
 Cate Blanchett (born 1969), two time Academy Award winning Australian actress
 Cate Shortland (born 1968), Australian writer and director of film and television
 Keith Cate, main anchor for WFLA-TV in Tampa Bay, Florida since 2000
 Field Cate, American child actor

In other fields
 Alf Cate (1878–1939), New Zealand cricketer
 Cate Campbell (born 1992), Australian swimmer
 Cate Edwards (born 1982), the oldest daughter of John Edwards
 Cate Tiernan (born 1961), American writer
 Cate School, four-year, coeducational, college-preparatory boarding school outside Santa Barbara
 George W. Cate (1825-1905), American politician
 James L. Cate, Air Force intelligence official and part of the Air Force Historical Division during World War II
 Troy Cate (born 1980), American baseball player
 Henk ten Cate (born 1954), Dutch football manager, and a former professional player
 Catê (1973-2011), Brazilian football manager, and a former professional player

See also 
 Catherina (and similar spellings)

References